International Publishers is a book publishing company based in New York City, specializing in Marxist works of economics, political science, and history.

Company history

Establishment

International Publishers Company, Inc., was founded in 1924 with funds given the project by Abraham A. Heller.  Heller was the radical son of a wealthy jeweler doing business in Paris. He expanded his fortune as head of the International Oxygen Company, a welding supply company that operated a trade concession in Soviet Russia during the time of the New Economic Policy in the early 1920s. A lifelong socialist, Heller had previously been a heavy financial donor to the New York Call, the Socialist Party's New York daily newspaper.  He had been instrumental in funding the purchase of the headquarters building for the Rand School of Social Science.

The company began with a capital stock of $50,000, paid in by Heller, with the stock subsequently split with Trachtenberg as compensation. Alexander Trachtenberg, a left wing member of the Socialist Party of America associated with the Rand School of Social Science and its publishing house, who joined the Communist movement at the end of 1921, served as manager of International Publishers from its inception through the 1940s.

The law firm for incorporating International Publishers was Hays, St. John & Buckley of 43 Exchange Place, whose partners included Arthur Garfield Hays.
According to testimony before the U.S. Congress by Trachtenberg, in addition to his initial $50,000 investment, Heller continually made up losses incurred by International Publishers during its first 15 years. Over that period, his investment climbed to a total of some $115,000.

The idea of forming International Publishers seems to have come from Heller and Trachtenberg.  Initial assistance came from the Communist Party (then the Workers Party of America), limited to supplying advice and addresses of radical bookstores around America. In a letter dated June 1924 from the party's head Literature Department, Nicholas Dozenberg, cautioned Trachtenberg that Charles H. Kerr & Co. of Chicago had already published many standard titles by Karl Marx, thus limiting the prospects of successful new editions of the same works. Instead, Dozenberg encouraged Trachtenberg to concentrate on "books not yet published in English written by popular Russian writers like Lenin, Zinoviev, Radek, and others."

Development

In the fall of 1935, International Publishers launched a new program called the "Book Union." This was a radical book-buying circle, modeled on the Book of the Month Club.  The Book Union first offered an anthology entitled Proletarian Literature in the United States, nearly 400 pages long and edited by current or future editors of The New Masses:  Michael Gold, Granville Hicks, Joseph North,  and others. The Book Union collected a $1 annual fee from its members, who then received a discounted volume in the mail each month.  The Book Union obliged members to buy 2 of 12 selections during the year.  Purchase of four books in a year entitled members to a bonus premium.  Despite its aggressively low pricing, the Book Union proved less successful than the Left Book Club operated by Victor Gollancz Ltd in England and seems to have been terminated after just a few years.

1939 Dies Committee
On September 13, 1939, International Publishers Secretary and Treasurer Alexander Trachtenberg was called before the so-called Dies Committee of the US House of Representatives, the Special Committee to Investigate Un-American Activities.  Committee members grilled Tractenberg on his own history, the sources of funding behind International Publishers, and the company's relationship to the Communist Party.  Trachtenberg characterized the relationship of International Publishers to the Communist Party as merely one of "buyer and seller."

Trachtenberg indicated that International Publishers did not own presses but used the services of a company called Van Rees Press on a contract basis.  The firm also exchanged printed sheets for publication with its British sister organization, Lawrence & Wishart, and bought sheets for binding from the forerunner of the official Foreign Languages Publishing House in Moscow.  He estimated that some 10% of International Publishers' books had made use of such sources but that a lowering of duty rates on bound books had largely eliminated the economy of importing unbound sheets.

Trachtenberg estimated annual sales by International Publishers at $75,000 to $80,000.  He noted that the company had a staff of four.

Recent years
During the 1960s and 1970s, International expanded its publication of inexpensive trade paperback books under the title "New World Paperbacks." A number of titles bore this as an alternative company logo.

Important publications
International Publishers has been party to the publication of a number of titles of lasting scholarly importance.

During the 1920s, International Publishers produced the first English-language editions of important works on Marxist theory by Karl Kautsky (Foundations of Christianity, 1925; Are the Jews a Race? 1926; Thomas More and His Utopia, 1927), Leon Trotsky (Literature and Revolution, 1925; Wither England? 1925; Wither Russia? 1926), Nikolai Bukharin (Historical Materialism, 1925, The Economic Theory of the Leisure Class, 1927; Imperialism and World Economy, 1929); and Joseph Stalin (Leninism, 1928).

International Publishers worked in conjunction with the Marx-Engels-Lenin Institute in Moscow on three separate publishing initiatives involving the works of V.I. Lenin: an aborted Collected Works project begun in 1927; a 12-volume Selected Works project issued 1934-1938 in green bindings; and a revised, 12-volume Selected Works edition published in blue bindings in 1943.  International also joined with the Communist Party of Great Britain's publishing house, Lawrence and Wishart and Progress Publishers (Moscow) to publish the massive, 50-volume Collected Works of Karl Marx and Frederick Engels, a project launched in 1975 and completed only in 2004.

International Publishers was an early reissuer of John Reed's legendary chronicle of the Russian Revolution, Ten Days That Shook the World. Originally published by Boni & Liveright in 1919, an International Publishers edition came out in 1926 and — except for a time during the reign of Joseph Stalin, when the book fell out of official favor — it has been a mainstay of the publishing house's catalog ever since.

International Publishers has also published a considerable number of memoir accounts by leading Communist Party participants, including those of William "Big Bill" Haywood (1929), Nadezhda Krupskaya (1930), William Z. Foster (two volumes, 1937 and 1930), Ella Reeve Bloor (1940), Joseph North (1958), W.E.B. Du Bois (1968), Benjamin J. Davis (1969), John Williamson (1969), William L. Patterson (1971), Hosea Hudson (1972), Elizabeth Gurley Flynn (reissue, 1973), Art Shields (two volumes, 1983 and 1986), Gil Green (1984) and Angela Davis (paperback reissue, 1988).

International Publishers was also a frequent publisher of prolific labor historian Philip S. Foner and published his landmark, 10-volume History of the Labor Movement in the United States (1947–1994) as well as his massive five-volume collection  The Life and Writings of Frederick Douglass (1950–1975).  The company also published the work of Herbert Aptheker, a historian specializing in African-American history.

Partial roster of authors

 Herbert Aptheker
 Anthony Bimba
 Earl Browder
 Alice Childress
 Angela Davis
 Horace B. Davis
 W.E.B. Du Bois
 Robert W. Dunn
 Frederick Engels
 Vera Figner
 Elizabeth Gurley Flynn

 Philip S. Foner
 William Z. Foster
 Antonio Gramsci
 Gus Hall
 Jack Hardy
 Grace Hutchins
 V. I. Lenin
 Karl Marx
 Scott Nearing

 Victor Perlo
 William J. Pomeroy
 Mike Quin
 John Reed
 Anna Rochester
 Joseph Stalin
 Charlotte Todes
 Leon Trotsky
 Alden Whitman
 Henry Winston

See also
 Alexander Trachtenberg
 James S. Allen
 Communist Party USA
 Bibliography on American Communism

References

Further reading
 Nicholas Dozenberg, "Establishing International Publishers," letter to Alexander Trachtenberg, June 19, 1924. Corvallis, OR: 1000 Flowers Publishers, 2010.
 David A. Lincove, "Radical Publishing to 'Reach the Million Masses': Alexander L. Trachtenberg and International Publishers, 1906-1966," Left History, Fall-Winter 2004, pp. 85–124.
 Alexander Trachtenberg, Testimony to the House Special Committee to Investigate Un-American Activities (aka Dies Committee), September 13, 1939. Published in Investigation of Un-America Propaganda Activities in the United States: Volume 7. Washington: US Government Printing Office, 1940; pp. 4863–4939.

External links
 International Publishers website, Intpubnyc.com, New York City. Retrieved August 22, 2010.
 Adrien Hilton, Guide to the Communist Party of the United States of America Printed Ephemera Collection, Tamiment Library and Robert F. Wagner Archives, Elmer Holmes Bobst Library, New York University, New York City. Retrieved August 23, 2010.
 Facebook page https://www.facebook.com/internationalpublishers/timeline

Book publishing companies based in New York (state)
Communist Party USA
Mass media companies based in New York City
Political book publishing companies
Publishing companies established in 1924
Soviet Union–United States relations